In Pahang Malay folklore, Walinong Sari (Jawi: والينوڠ ساري) was a legendary princess of Inderapura renowned for her beauty and fighting skills. The tale of the princess was immortalized in a folk song named after her.

The legend
Princess Walinong Sari was said to have lived in Inderapura, in the Old Pahang Kingdom. She is described as an exceptionally beautiful princess with a strong character. Highly skilled with spears and swords, she was renowned for her mastery of silat, the Malay martial art.

As the tales of her beauty and skills spread across the neighboring kingdoms, many came to ask for her hand in marriage, but the princess found none of them acceptable. Her father became worried about finding a suitable husband for his daughter. At the same time, the celestial king, Raja Mambang Segara, whose abode was also Mount Tahan, heard of the princess. He was intrigued by her stories and decided to find out the truth about her. Disguised as an ugly man, he came down from the mountain to look for her.

When he finally got an audience with the princess, Raja Mambang Segara found that she kept her face covered with a veil all the time. He decided to test her silat skills by challenging her to a duel, claiming that he could defeat her. This was a challenge the princess could not resist for she had never lost a fight. At an agreed time and place, the duel started. As both of them were equally good warriors, the duel prolonged for three days and three nights. But at the end of the third day, the princess’s veil fell off, exposing her extraordinary beauty to Raja Mambang Segara for the first time. The king was instantly stunned by her beauty, and immediately fainted.

When they washed him, his true appearance emerged and Princess Walinong Sari fell in love with him. But when the celestial king’s father, Raja Laksamana Petir, saw the events unfold from the peak of Mount Tahan, he became very angry, for no celestial being could faint or lose a fight with a mere mortal beauty. He threw bolts of thunder and lightning at Inderapura, and, when the storm was over, Raja Mambang Segara had disappeared into thin air. Later that night, Princess Walinong Sari had a dream, in which a wise man told her that Raja Mambang Segara was the celestial king of Mount Tahan. After she awoke the next day, she disappeared from the palace to look for her beloved, never to be seen again.

Folk song
The story is referenced in the folk song Walinong Sari. Among the earliest contemporary renditions of the song was by Rafeah Buang who included the song in her album Bingkisan dari Pahang which she dedicated solely to Pahang folk songs. Another famous rendition was by Siti Nurhaliza, who included the song in her duet album, Seri Balas (1999).

In popular culture
 The princess became the subject of Ore Struck Media's and Universiti Tunku Abdul Rahman's (UTAR) animated short film, Walinong Sari which was released in 2022. The short film premiered at the New York International Short Film Festival, Sea Of Art Film Festival in Norway, Los Angeles International Film Festival and the Oniros Film Awards New York among others.

References

Bibliography
 
 

Malaysian legends
Mythological princesses